The 1974 IIHF European U19 Championship was the seventh playing of the IIHF European Junior Championships.

Group A 
Played in Herisau, Switzerland, from March 22–30, 1974.

Switzerland was relegated to Group B for 1975.

Tournament Awards
Top Scorer: Kent Nilsson  (16 Points)
Top Goalie: Åke Andersson
Top Defenceman:Vladislav Vlček
Top Forward: Thomas Gradin

Group B 
Played in Bucharest, Romania from March 9–20, 1974

First round
Group 1

Group 2

Placing round 

West Germany was promoted to Group A for 1975.

References

Complete results

Junior
IIHF European Junior Championship tournament
International ice hockey competitions hosted by Switzerland
International ice hockey competitions hosted by Romania
U19
U19
Herisau
1970s in Bucharest
Sports competitions in Bucharest
IIHF European U19 Championship
IIHF European U19 Championship